Yves Sandrier (1938–1958) was a Swiss poet and singer.

1938 births
1958 deaths
Musicians from Budapest
20th-century Swiss male singers